Saints Academy may refer to:

 Saints Academy (Mississippi), a school in Mississippi
 Southampton F.C. Under-23s and Academy, English football club